Natália Bastos Bonavides is a Brazilian politician.

In 2016 she was elected to the Natal City Council by the Workers' Party.

In 2018 she was elected as a federal deputy for Rio Grande do Norte.

References

1988 births
Brazilian politicians
Living people